Cottesloe is a small suburb west of downtown Johannesburg, around 3 km northwest of City Hall, west of Braamfontein, north of Vrededorp and Jan Hofmeyer, and south of Parktown. It is named by the first Minister of Lands, Adam Jameson, after Cottesloe, Western Australia, around 11 km southwest of Perth.

In 1960, the neighborhood became famous as the site of the Cottesloe Consultation.

See also 
 Cottesloe Reformed Church

Sources 
 Raper, Peter Edmund (2004). New Dictionary of South African Place Names. Johannesburg/Cape Town: Jonathan Ball Publishers.

References 

Johannesburg Region F
Suburbs of Johannesburg